Behind the Music is a documentary television series on VH1. Each episode profiles and interviews a popular musical artist or group. The program examines the beginning of their career, their road to success, and the hardships they may have encountered.

In 2021, it was announced that the series would be rebooted by Paramount+, which premiered on July 29, 2021.

Premise
Each show focuses on a musician or musical group, documenting both the successes of the musicians and the problems they faced during their careers. Except for the first two episodes (which focused on Milli Vanilli and M.C. Hammer), all programs are narrated by Jim Forbes. Forbes was later used to narrate the Milli Vanilli episode when it was modified to include the death of Rob Pilatus. The UK airings of the episodes focusing on Thin Lizzy, Aerosmith and Genesis were narrated by Mary Anne Hobbs while Forbes narrated the US airings.

VH1's criterion for choosing the musicians who appear on the show is, in many cases, to profile those who are no longer in the music industry, or were moderately significant in rock history (although many are in the Rock and Roll Hall of Fame such as Neil Diamond, The Police, Metallica, AC/DC, Aerosmith among others). This is as opposed to VH1's other biography show, VH1's Legends, which profiles musicians that have been very significant to the industry. However, there are some artists that were profiled on both Behind The Music and Legends, including Tina Turner, Elton John, The Who (although their Behind the Music exclusively focused on their drummer Keith Moon), and John Lennon (although Behind The Music exclusively focused on the months and days leading to his murder in 1980).

Origins
While being interviewed by Rolling Stone in October 2000, co-creator and executive producer Gay Rosenthal explained "Jeff Gaspin, who’s the executive vice president of VH1, and I were at lunch, and we said, 'Whatever happened to Milli Vanilli?' I said, 'I don’t know, but why don’t you let me take the ball and run with it, and let me see what I can find out?' Milli Vanilli was hard. Nobody knew where they were. I had to be a private eye. I got a list of addresses where Fabrice had lived and sent letters to every address. Two weeks later, I got a call from Fabrice's manager. And then I spent a good two months with them – having dinner, having them at my house – before they agreed to do it. They didn't know if they wanted to relive the story, but I said, 'Listen, no one has heard your story from you. This will be a great opportunity to set the record straight.'" "When we saw it in the edit room, we thought we had something special. The stories were working, and the series was green-lit." Rosenthal later stated in an August 1999 interview with The Philadelphia Inquirer.

Spin-offs and revival
Another episode of Behind the Music on KISS was re-christened KISS: Beyond the Makeup in July 2001 (which was two hours in length). This featured Matt Pinfield, formerly of MTV's 120 Minutes, as narrator instead of Jim Forbes.

In June, 2000, VH1 aired the BBC produced Behind the Music like program on Pink Floyd entitled Behind The Wall which coincided with the release of the band's Is There Anybody Out There? The Wall Live 1980-81 album and focused on the making of The Wall album, concerts that went with it and The Wall film and had interviews with the band members and featured no narration.

A short-lived half-hour spin-off series titled BTM2 (short for Behind the Music 2), chronicled the careers of newer upcoming artists.

A spin-off titled Behind the Music: Remastered on VH1 Classic airs the updated original episodes with new interviews, footage, and the later half of the artist's career. The series also included two original episodes on Deep Purple and Motörhead.

In September 2020, a spin-off known as MTV's Behind the Music: The Top 40 was announced for Paramount+, which was to feature a countdown of the 40 "biggest artists of all-time". In March 2021, it was revealed via a promo aired during the Grammy Awards that the spin-off would instead be positioned as a full reboot of Behind the Music, seven years after the last episode had aired on July 16, 2014. In May 2021, it was announced that the revival would premiere on July 29, 2021, with two episodes.

Musicians
The following is a list of artists who have appeared in episodes of the series:

 50 Cent (revisited in 2013)
 Aaliyah (revisited in 2012)
 AC/DC
 Aerosmith
 Christina Aguilera
 Akon
 Tori Amos (BTM2)
 The Animals
 Anthrax (remastered in 2011)
 Backstreet Boys
 Bad Company (remastered in 2013)
 Badfinger
 The Bangles
 Barenaked Ladies
 Fantasia Barrino
 Bay City Rollers
 Beck (BTM2)
 Pat Benatar (remastered in 2011)
 The Black Crowes
 Mary J. Blige 
 Blind Melon
 Blondie (remastered in 2012)
 Blues Traveler
 Bon Jovi
 Sonny Bono
 Boyz II Men
 Brandy
 Toni Braxton
 Meredith Brooks (BTM2)
 Bobby Brown
 Lindsey Buckingham
 Bush (BTM2)
 Glen Campbell
 Mariah Carey
 The Carpenters
 David Cassidy
 Harry Chapin
 Cher
 Chicago
 Joe Cocker
 Natalie Cole
 Paula Cole (BTM2)
 Sean Combs
 Alice Cooper (remastered in 2010)
 Counting Crows (BTM2)
 Creed
 Jim Croce
 David Crosby
 Sheryl Crow
 The Cult
 Deep Purple (second original Behind the Music: Remastered episode)
 Def Leppard (remastered in 2010)
 John Denver
 Depeche Mode
 Neil Diamond
 Celine Dion
 Dixie Chicks (BTM2)
 DMX
 Snoop Dogg
 The Doobie Brothers
 Dr. Dre
 Duran Duran (remastered in 2010 & 2021)
 Missy Elliott
 Gloria Estefan
 Melissa Etheridge
 Eve
 Everclear
 Marianne Faithfull
 Fat Joe
 Fleetwood Mac (remastered in 2010)
 Foreigner (remastered in 2013)
 Peter Frampton
 Alan Freed
 The Game
 Garbage
 Leif Garrett (remastered in 2010)
 Gloria Gaynor
 Genesis (remastered in 2010)
 Boy George & Culture Club (remastered in 2010)
 Andy Gibb
 The Go-Go's (remastered in 2012)
 Goo Goo Dolls
 Grand Funk Railroad
 Green Day (remastered in 2010)
 Guns N' Roses
 Gym Class Heroes
 Hall & Oates (remastered in 2010)
 Geri Halliwell (BTM2)
 MC Hammer
 Heart (remastered in 2010)
 Faith Hill
 Hootie and the Blowfish
 Jennifer Hudson
 Michael Hutchence (remastered in 2010)
 Ice Cube
 Ice-T
 Billy Idol
 Enrique Iglesias (BTM2)
 Rick James (remastered in 2011)
 Jan and Dean
 Jefferson Airplane
 Fat Joe
 Billy Joel
 Elton John
 Quincy Jones
 Journey
 Judas Priest (remastered in 2010)
 KC and the Sunshine Band
 Kid Rock
 Gladys Knight
 Lenny Kravitz
 Nick Lachey
 Adam Lambert
 Miranda Lambert
 Queen Latifah
 Cyndi Lauper
 John Lennon (Titled "John Lennon: The Last Years and the Legacy"; remastered in 2010)
 Julian Lennon
 Huey Lewis and the News (Remastered in 2021)
 Jerry Lee Lewis
 LL Cool J (Remastered in 2021)
 Jennifer Lopez
 Courtney Love
 Ludacris
 Lynyrd Skynyrd (remastered in 2010)
 Madonna (featured in 1998; continued 2001)
 The Mamas & the Papas
 Bob Marley
 Ricky Martin (revisited in 2011 & 2021)
 Matchbox Twenty
 Meat Loaf (remastered in 2010)
 Megadeth (remastered in 2011)
 John Mellencamp
 Metallica (remastered in 2010)
 George Michael
 Bret Michaels (remastered in 2021)
 Bette Midler
 Milli Vanilli (premiere episode; later updated)
 The Monkees
 Keith Moon
 Alanis Morissette
 Mötley Crüe (remastered in 2010)
 Motörhead (the first all-original Behind the Music: Remastered episode)
 Nas
 Nelly
 Ne-Yo
 Ricky Nelson
 Willie Nelson
 New Edition
 New Kids on the Block (remastered in 2021)
 Stevie Nicks
 No Doubt
 The Notorious B.I.G. (revisited in 2012)
 Ted Nugent (one of two episodes ever to have a viewer warning; remastered in 2012)
 Oasis
 Sinéad O'Connor
 Tony Orlando
 Ozzy Osbourne
 Donny & Marie Osmond
 Pantera (the second episode to have a viewer warning; remastered in 2013)
 The Partridge Family
 Teddy Pendergrass
 Linda Perry (final episode)
 Tom Petty
 Pink (revisited in 2012)
 Pitbull
 Poison (remastered in 2010)
 The Police
 Iggy Pop
 Public Enemy
 Quiet Riot
 Bonnie Raitt
 Ratt
 Red Hot Chili Peppers
 R.E.M.
 REO Speedwagon
 Busta Rhymes (remastered in 2021)
 Lionel Richie
 Robbie Robertson
 Run-D.M.C.
 Salt-N-Pepa
 Nicole Scherzinger
 Selena
 Brian Setzer
 Frank Sinatra (half-hour retrospective that aired on the day of his death in 1998)
 Smash Mouth (BTM2)
 Britney Spears
 Spice Girls
 Rick Springfield
 Steppenwolf
 Cat Stevens
 Rod Stewart
 Sting
 Styx (remastered in 2012)
 Sublime
 Donna Summer
 Thin Lizzy (remastered in 2013)
 T.I.
 Tiffany
 TLC (continued in 2004; remastered in 2011)
 Peter Tosh
 T-Pain
 Train
 Tina Turner
 Shania Twain
 Twisted Sister (remastered in 2013)
 Carrie Underwood
 Usher
 Vanilla Ice
 Lil Wayne
 Barry White
 "Weird Al" Yankovic (remastered in 2010)

Other features
Other than musicians, some episodes were documentaries on musical events, films, and non-musicians who were influential on the music world. The following appeared in episodes of the series:

 1968
 1970
 1972
 1975
 1977
 1981
 1984
 1987
 1992
 1994
 1999
 2000
 Flashdance
 Alan Freed
 The Day the Music Died
 Grease
 Hair
 Lilith Fair
 The Rocky Horror Picture Show
 Saturday Night Fever
 Russell Simmons
 Studio 54
 Woodstock 1969

Reception

Accolades 
Behind the Music was nominated for five Primetime Emmy Awards including the Outstanding Non-Fiction Series category for four constitutive years (2000-2003).

In 1999, the series won an ALMA Award for Outstanding Made-for-Television Documentary for the episode featuring Selena and in 2001, Behind the Music won a TV Guide Award for Music Series of the Year.

Behind the Music episodes received multiple nominations including a GLAAD Media Award nomination for Outstanding Film (Documentary) in 1998 for the episode featuring Boy George as well as multiple Image Awards for episodes featuring Tina Turner and Bob Marley.

Similar VH1 programs
The following is a list of artists who have appeared in VH1 TV programs similar in format to Behind the Music but are not officially part of the series:

 Chris Gaines (titled Behind the Life of Chris Gaines as it was a fictional artist played by Garth Brooks)
 Kiss (renamed KISS: Beyond the Makeup, 90 minutes in length)
 Pink Floyd (titled Pink Floyd: Behind the Wall, 50-minute documentary made in 2000 on The Wall album)

Popular culture

Film
 In the movie Josie and the Pussycats, it is explained that Behind the Music was created as a result of how bands are "dealt with" if they discover the fact they are involved in the government's subliminal message program.

Music
 The band Steel Panther released a fictitious episode about themselves that featured Dave Navarro, Dee Snider, Jani Lane, and Kat Von D, among others.
 "Weird Al" Yankovic mentioned the Lynyrd Skynyrd episode in his song "Trapped in the Drive-Thru".

Television
 Adult Swim's Robot Chicken did a skit where the Muppet band, The Electric Mayhem, was profiled on Behind the Music.
 In the made-for-television film A Diva's Christmas Carol starring Vanessa L. Williams, the character of Ebony * Scrooge watches her own episode near the end. This episode, filling the role as the Ghost of Christmas Yet to Come, chronicles the life and tragic death in an ominous manner to force Ebony to change her ways.
 In the Duck Dodgers episode "In Space, No One Can Hear You Rock", Dodgers plays a recorded episode of "Behind The Metal" about Dave Mustaine which is a parody of the Megadeth episode of "Behind the Music".
 In the Family Guy episode "The Thin White Line", Brian explains to his psychiatrist, "You wanna know how pathetic my life is?" I've seen that 'Behind the Music' with Leif Garrett eighteen times." A subsequent cutaway gag is shown with a briefly shown animated recreation of the episode, and then cuts to Brian on the couch lip-synching to the dialogue.
 In the Friends episode "The One with the Joke", Chandler tells Joey, "Dude, you have got to turn on Behind The Music. The band Heart is having a really tough time, and I think they may break up."
 An episode of The Man Show showed a parody of Behind the Music with the band Korn, called Beneath the Music. It showed the two hosts as ex-members of the band but later being kicked out because of their antics.
 A late episode of Mystery Science Theater 3000 features a skit parodying Behind the Music about an unnamed band featured in that episode's movie, Track of the Moon Beast; the writers christened them "The Band That Played 'California Lady'", after the apparent title of the song they performed in the film.
 Saturday Night Live's "More cowbell" sketch was a fictitious episode profiling Blue Öyster Cult. SNL would go on to do various skits that parodied BTM including Fat Albert, The Super Bowl Shuffle, Joan Jett, Rock and Roll Heaven, John Oats, Colin Hay.
 An episode of Conan aired a parody of Behind the Music featuring the Star Wars Cantina Band.
 The show was parodied on the South Park episode "Terrance and Phillip: Behind the Blow". As well as the episode "Chef Aid: Behind the Menu", which also featured Jim Forbes as narrator.
 On the show Still Standing, Bill and his sister-in-law's new boyfriend sit in a bar and watch part of an episode of Behind The Music.
 An episode of What's New, Scooby-Doo? had a spoof of the show, called Rewind the Music.
 The Simpsons episode "Behind the Laughter" was done in the style of Behind the Music. It even used the show's theme music and narrator.
 An episode of The Jamie Foxx Show Season 4, Episode 16 had a spoof of the show, called Behind the Jingle.
 In How I Met Your Mother season 8, episode 15, a parody of Behind the Music was used, named Underneath the Tunes, about the transformation of Robin Sparkles into Robin Daggers.

Online
 The show is also the base for the running parody Behind the Music that Sucks, which has been produced by Internet humor site Heavy.com since 1998.
 The flash animation collaboration based on the Super Mario franchise, Bowser's Kingdom on Newgrounds.com parodied Behind the Music in the tenth episode Bowser's Kingdom: Behind the Kingdom.
 In order to promote his full-length film, internet comedian Stuart Ashen released a parody called Behind the Tat.

Advertising
 A Chex Mix campaign featuring The Backstreet Boys entitled "Sound Checks- The Story of Snackstreet" borrows heavily from the Behind The Music format.

See also
 Pop-Up Video
 List of television programs

References

External links
 
 
 Official VH1 Website for Behind the Music

1990s American documentary television series
1990s American music television series
1997 American television series debuts
2000s American documentary television series
2000s American music television series
2010s American documentary television series
2010s American music television series
2014 American television series endings
2020s American documentary television series
2020s American music television series
2021 American television series debuts
2022 American television series endings
American television series revived after cancellation
Documentary television series about music
English-language television shows
Paramount+ original programming
Pop music television series
Rock music television series
Television series by CBS Studios
VH1 music shows
VH1 original programming